Tengchong Tuofeng Airport  is an airport serving Tengchong in the west of Yunnan Province. It is located near the village of Tuofeng, Qingshui Township, 12 kilometers south of the city seat. It takes about 15 minutes by car to arrive in central Tengchong City. The airport was opened on 16 February 2009. Due to increasing demand, especially from domestic tourism, a new and much larger terminal (Terminal 2) opened on 9 September 2018.

Airlines and destinations

See also
 List of airports in China
 List of the busiest airports in the People's Republic of China

References

Airports in Yunnan
Airports established in 2009
2009 establishments in China
Transport in Baoshan, Yunnan